USS Seymour D. Owens (DD-767) was scheduled to be a  destroyer in the United States Navy. She was named for Seymour D. Owens, a United States Navy officer killed during World War II.

Seymour D. Owens was laid down on 3 April 1944 by the Bethlehem Steel Company, San Francisco, California, and was assigned the name Seymour D. Owens on 8 January 1945. Seymour Owens was the captain of the destroyer ; he was killed in action during World War II off the coast of Tinian aboard Norman Scott on 24 July 1944.

Since Seymour D. Owens was incomplete at the end of World War II, further construction was cancelled on 7 January 1946, and the incomplete ship was delivered to the U.S. Navy on 28 February 1947. Portions of her hull were used to repair the destroyer . The remainder of her hull was then berthed with the Pacific Reserve Fleet where it remained until sold for scrapping to National Metal and Steel on 23 March 1959. The name Seymour D. Owens was struck from the Naval Vessel Register on 9 June 1958.

External links
 Photo gallery at navsource.org

Cancelled ships of the United States Navy
Ships built in San Francisco
1946 ships
Gearing-class destroyers of the United States Navy